Midlothian is a council area and historic shire of Scotland, formerly known as Edinburghshire.

Midlothian may also refer to:
Midlothian (Scottish Parliament constituency)
Midlothian (UK Parliament constituency)
Midlothian, Illinois, US
Midlothian, Maryland, US
Midlothian, Oklahoma, US
Midlothian, Texas, US
Midlothian, Virginia, US

Edinburghshire may also refer to:
Edinburghshire (Parliament of Scotland constituency)
Edinburghshire (UK Parliament constituency)
Edinburghshire Constabulary (1975–2013), the Lothian and Borders Police for the Scottish councils of Edinburgh, Midlothian, and others.

See also
Heart of Midlothian (disambiguation)